The Tutong language, also known as Basa Tutong, is a language spoken by approximately 17,000 people in Brunei. It is the main language of the Tutong people, the majority ethnic group in the Tutong District of Brunei.

Classification 
Tutong is an Austronesian language and belongs to the Rejang–Baram group of languages spoken in Brunei as well as Kalimantan, Indonesia, and Sarawak, Malaysia. Tutong is related to the Belait language with roughly 54% of basic vocabulary being cognate.

Language use 
Today, many speakers of Tutong are shifting away from the traditional language and code-mix or code-shift with Brunei Malay, Standard Malay and English. The language has been given a vitality rating of 2.5 based on a scale of 0–6 that uses the measures of the rate of transmission to future generations, the level of official support, and the geographical concentration of speakers. This means it is considered endangered.

Nonetheless, there is interest in revitalising the language. Since 2012, a module has been taught in Tutong at Universiti Brunei Darussalam. Similarly, the Dewan Bahasa dan Pustaka (Brunei's language agency) published a Tutong–Malay, Malay–Tutong dictionary in 1991 and a word list of several Brunei languages in 2011.

References

Resources 

 
  

Languages of Brunei
Berawan–Lower Baram languages